The Saint Brynach Cross or Nevern Cross is a 10th or 11th century stone cross at St Brynach's church, Nevern.

History 
The cross is thought to date from the 10th or 11th century. Legend has it that the first cuckoo of the year in West Wales stands on the top of the cross and sings on the day of St Brynach's feast on the 7th of April.

The cross stands at 3.72m tall in the churchyard of St Brynach's Church and was first noted to be in its current position in 1603 by George Owen of Henllys.

The cross is made of Ordovician stone and of two separate pieces, the rectangular shaft and the cross-head.The cross shows interlaced and fret patterns carved into the rock which have viking influence. An inscription "DNS" on the western side of the cross translates as "Lord" and an inscription on the eastern face translates as "Hauen".

It is likely that both the Saint Brynach Cross and the Carew Cross were made in the same monastery workshop and date to the second half of the 10th century or early 11th century.

The Saint Brynach Cross, Carew Cross and Maen Achwyfan are considered the three outstanding high crosses of Wales.

See also 

 Archaeology of Wales
 Wales in the Middle Ages
 Carew Cross
 Maen Achwyfan Cross

References 

Welsh artefacts
Celtic crosses
High crosses